Major General William Robb (23 November 1888 – 27 March 1961)  was a senior British Army officer, who served in both World War I and World War II.

Family background
William Robb was born in Hexham Northumberland on 23 November 1888. The Robb family owned a successful department store business in Hexham. He was educated in Edinburgh at George Watson's College as a boarding scholar.

He was one of five children and all the male siblings would serve in the forces. One of his younger brothers - Sir James Milne Robb would rise to the rank of Air Vice Marshal in the Royal Air Force; all three of the Robb brothers (including William) would see service in the First World War as officers in the Northumberland Fusiliers; although one would go on to join the RAF.

Robb was a keen amateur cricketer and played minor counties cricket for Northumberland in 1912 and 1913, making two appearances in the Minor Counties Championship.

William Robb married Nancy Chrystal Dodds in Hexham, Northumberland in 1916. They had one son William Walter Milroy Robb, who was born in 1919.

After a lengthy absence from Northumberland during his career in the British Army Robb returned to live in the county, in the village of Corbridge; although he died on 27 March 1961 in Matfen, Northumberland.

Military career

Early career and First World War
Robb was commissioned into a militia battalion of the Northumberland Fusiliers on 8 January 1907; but he later transferred to the 4th Battalion of the Northumberland Fusiliers (a Territorial Force/TF unit) as a second lieutenant on 1 April 1908. He was promoted to lieutenant in 1910. He was promoted to captain on 5 December 1912; serving with the battalion's D Company based at Prudhoe.

In 1914, the year the First World War began, Robb was mobilised for war, along with his battalion, and he is recorded as entering the theatre of operations, the Western Front, in April 1915. The battalion formed part of the 149th (Northumberland) Brigade, itself part of the 50th (Northumbrian) Division. He was awarded the Military Cross (MC) whilst serving with the Northumberland Fusiliers. Whilst on the Western Front with his unit Captain Robb was recorded as an active and popular member of the 4th Battalion the Northumberland Fusiliers. He was even given temporary lieutenant colonel rank and commanded the battalion in the Battle of St Quentin on 21 March 1918; during this particularly fierce battle he was wounded and evacuated.

Between the wars
After the war he decided to 'soldier on' and accepted a regular commission in the King's Own Yorkshire Light Infantry (KOYLI). By 5 June 1920 Robb was a captain in the 2nd Battalion the KOYLI. The battalion would see service in India from April 1922 and Robb served with his family until 1925 when they returned on a troopship to England. Robb remained in India serving as a staff officer at the headquarters of Kohat District in 1926.

An Army List of 1938 recorded that Robb was commanding the 2nd Battalion, North Staffordshire Regiment and that he had been in post since 12 April 1936, having been promoted to lieutenant colonel on 1 July 1933. The battalion was then serving in Palestine during the Arab revolt in Palestine. One of Robb's officers was Major William Donovan Stamer, who would later go on to become a major-general and Colonel of the North Staffordshire Regiment.

Second World War
The August 1939 British Army List recorded Robb as promoted to colonel on 1 July 1936 and later in 1939 recorded as a temporary brigadier commanding an infantry brigade. In 1940 he was part of the ill-fated British Expeditionary Force (BEF), commanding the 9th Infantry Brigade (part of Bernard Montgomery's 3rd Infantry Division). In recognition of his performance during the retreat to Dunkirk and the evacuation of his brigade Colonel (Temporary Brigadier) William Robb was awarded the DSO.

Shortly after returning from Dunkirk Robb was given command of the Senior Officers' School at Sheerness, a post he held until March 1941 when he briefly took command of the 73rd Independent Infantry Brigade. From 19 May 1941 to August 1943 he was put in charge of part of the defence of South Wales (specifically the Severn Sub-area) and he clearly did well at this post, as Colonel William Robb DSO MC (late of the North Staffordshire Regiment (The Prince of Wales's)) was made CBE in 1943.

On 23 August 1943 Colonel (temporary brigadier) William Robb was granted the acting rank of major general. After the promotion he was posted to Malta as General Officer Commanding the army garrison on the islands, remaining in post until 1945. A popular military beach club in the Pembroke Army Garrison area was named after him - the Robb Lido (which was redeveloped as a commercial hotel complex overlooking St George's Bay).

Post-war
On 23 November 1946 Colonel (Honorary Major General) Robb reached the age limit of liability to recall, and ceased to be held on the Reserve of Officers and was retired from the army; although he did take up the honorary post of regimental colonel of the KOYLI. He relinquished his post as regimental colonel of the KOYLI on 1 August 1950, a post he had held for three years.

References

Bibliography

External links
Generals of World War II

|-

|-

Commanders of the Order of the British Empire
Companions of the Distinguished Service Order
Recipients of the Military Cross
English cricketers
Northumberland cricketers
People from Corbridge
People from Hexham
Royal Northumberland Fusiliers officers
King's Own Yorkshire Light Infantry officers
North Staffordshire Regiment officers
British Army personnel of World War I
British Army generals of World War II
Commandants of the Senior Officers' School, Sheerness
British Army major generals
British military personnel of the 1936–1939 Arab revolt in Palestine
Military personnel from Northumberland